Qaladəhnə (also, Kaladagna, Kaladagnya, and Kaladakhna) is a village in the Astara Rayon of Azerbaijan.

References 

Populated places in Astara District